Euleptus is a genus of beetles in the family Carabidae, containing the following species:

 Euleptus albicornis Kolbe, 1889
 Euleptus caffer Boheman, 1848
 Euleptus coriacea Habu, 1973
 Euleptus foveolatus Kolbe, 1889
 Euleptus geniculatus Klug, 1833
 Euleptus intermedius Peringuey, 1896
 Euleptus jeanneli Burgeon, 1935
 Euleptus kilimanus Basilewsky, 1962
 Euleptus ooderus Chaudoir, 1850
 Euleptus paganus Kuntzen, 1919
 Euleptus peringueyi Csiki, 1931
 Euleptus virens Gestro, 1895
 Euleptus zuluanus (Barker, 1922)

References

Platyninae